Scutelliseta swaziana is one of the smaller dung flies. This species was described by Richards in 1968. It is currently only known from Eswatini (Swaziland).

References

swaziana
Endemic fauna of Eswatini